The Known Universe is the fourth studio album by Cincinnati-based indie rock band Ass Ponys, released in April 1996 on A&M Records. It was the band's second album for A&M (after 1994's Electric Rock Music), and was produced by the Afghan Whigs' John Curley.

Critical reception
The Known Universe received favorable reviews from Spin, Rolling Stone, and Details upon its release. Trouser Press Vickie Gilmer, however, was less favorable, writing of the album that "Sounding like slapdash country kin of the Barenaked Ladies, the Ass Ponys retread familiar soil, relying on exhausted film jokes ("God Tells Me To") and mild outrage ("Cancer Show"), all the while belaboring clichés like "I could rule the world if..." (a self-mocking line Tin Huey used to better effect fifteen years earlier) and real-life oddities like the oft-derided "Satin lives in hell" graffiti."

Track listing
All songs written by Bill Alletzhauser, Randy Cheek, Chuck Cleaver, and David Morrison, except where noted.
 Shoe Money
 Under Cedars And Stars (Alletzhauser, Cheek, Cleaver, Jack Ison, Morrison)
 God Tells Me To
 Blow Oskar
 Cancer Show
 Dead Fly The Birds
 And She Drowned
 Redway
 French Muscleman
 It's Summer Here
 John Boat
 Hagged
 Some Kind Of Fun

Personnel
Ass Ponys – producer
John Curley – engineer, producer
Steve Girton –	engineer
Jack Ison –	keyboards

References

1996 albums
Ass Ponys albums
A&M Records albums